Sonal Vengurlekar is an Indian television actress who appears in Hindi television. She is known for playing Devyani Shastri in Shastri Sisters (2014–2015), Survi Barve and Khushi Dharmadhikari in Yeh Vaada Raha (2015–2017), Mandira Rajput in Saam Daam Dand Bhed (2017–2018), and Anjali Hinduja in Kundali Bhagya (2022–2023).

Early life 
In 2018, Vengurlekar accused photographer and casting director, Raja Bajaj, father of TV actress Sheena Bajaj, of sexually harassing her during her struggling days. She has also been a very vocal supporter of the Me Too movement in India.

Career 
In 2012, she ventured into the television industry. Sonal started her career in the television industry with the serial  She was seen in Dil Dosti Dance and Buddy Project. 

In the year 2014, Sonal gained stardom on television from the serial Shastri Sisters. She also worked in Yeh Rishta Kya Kehlata Hai. Sonal was seen in Yeh Teri Galiyan and Laal Ishq as Nandini and Riya, in the year 2019.

From 2020 to 2021, she portrayed Jaya Gupta in Star Bharat's Gupta Brothers. In 2021, she was cast as Sanya Dubash in StarPlus' popular show Yeh Hai Chahatein.

In 2022, she joined as Savitri in Sony TV's Mere Sai - Shraddha Aur Saburi. Then she was as Kiran in Parineetii. Later she was seen portraying Anjali in Kundali Bhagya.

Filmography

Films

Television

References

External links

 
 

Living people
Year of birth missing (living people)
People from Mumbai
Indian film actresses
21st-century Indian actresses
Actresses in Hindi television
Indian television actresses
Indian soap opera actresses